Herb Barten (born January 13, 1928) is an American former middle distance runner who competed in the 1948 Summer Olympics, where he placed fourth with a time of 1:50.1 in the 800 meter. Barten was the AAU 800 meter champion in 1948 and placed second the following year. Barten attended the University of Michigan from 1946 to 1949, where he claimed five individual Big Ten titles. In 2007, he was inducted into the Michigan Men's Track and Field hall of fame. As of 2016, Barten resides in Clemson, South Carolina where he "enjoys watching the youngsters compete [in the Olympics] every four years."

1948 London Olympics

Round 1 
The first four in each heat qualified for the Semi-finals.

Heat 2

Semifinals

Heat 3

Finals

References

1928 births
Living people
American male middle-distance runners
Olympic track and field athletes of the United States
Athletes (track and field) at the 1948 Summer Olympics
Michigan Wolverines men's track and field athletes